Auxiliary armour in a set of Japanese armour are optional pieces worn by the samurai class of feudal Japan in addition to the traditional six armour components.

Description
The six major articles or components of Japanese armour (hei-no-rokugu, roku gu, or roku gusoku) are the dou or dō (chest armour), kabuto (helmet), mengu (facial armour), kote (armoured sleeves), sune-ate (shin armour), and the hai-date (thigh armour). Additional armour protection was available for the neck, armpit, chest, waist and feet. These auxiliary armours covered areas of the body that were exposed by gaps in the regular armour items or where additional protection was required.

Wakibiki
Wakibiki are simple rectangles of cloth covered with kusari (chain armor), karuta (small rectangular or square plates), or kikko (hexagon plates). These iron or leather armours or a combination of them were sewn to the cloth backing. Wakibiki could also be made from one solid piece of iron or hardened leather. The wakibiki had cords connected to them which allowed the wakibiki to hang from the shoulder, the wakibiki was then suspended over the exposed arm pit area.  Wakibiki were worn inside of the chest armour dou (dō) or on the outside depending on the type.

Manju no wa
Manju no wa, ( also manjunowa or manju nowa ) are a combination of shoulder pads, collar and armpit guards in one that protected the upper chest area. Manju no wa were covered with different types of armour including  kusari (chain armour), karuta (small square or rectangular armour plates), or kikko (hexagon plates), these iron or leather armours or a combination of them were sewn to a cloth backing. The armour could be exposed or hidden between a layer of cloth. When worn the manju no wa looked like a small tight fitting vest. Manju no wa have small wings that would pass under the arm pit area from the back and attach to the front of the manju no wa with a button, toggle or ties.

Manchira
Manchira are a type of armoured vest covered with different types of armour including  kusari (chain armour), karuta (small square or rectangular armour plates), or kikko (hexagon plates), these iron or leather armours or a combination of them were sewn to a cloth backing.  The armour could be exposed or hidden between a layer of cloth. Manchira are usually larger than manju no wa and protected the chest area and sometimes the neck and arm pit. Some manchira could be worn over the chest armour dou (dō) .

Tate-eri
Tate-eri are small padded pillow like pieces with a standing armoured collar that sits on the shoulder to protect from the weight of the breastplate or cuirass (dō). The standing collar would be lined with kikko (hexagon plates) armour to protect the neck.

Kōgake
Kōgake are various types of armoured socks that could cover just the top of the foot or be worn as a shoe or slipper. Kōgake could be covered with small iron plates or chainmail.

Nodowa and guruwa
Nodowa and guruwa are similar types of neck protection, the nodowa would be tied around the back of the neck and the guruwa wrapped completely around the neck.

See also
Japanese armour

References

External links

 Examination and restoration of an antique Japanese manchira
 Anthony Bryant's web site.
 Pattern from Anthony Bryants web site.

Samurai armour
Japanese clothing